Actaeon or Acteon (Ἀκτέων) was a hero in Greek mythology.

Actaeon or Acteon may also refer to:

Mythology
 Actaeon, son of Melissus, another mythical person, victim of Archias of Corinth

Arts and entertainment
 Acteón (film), 1965 Spanish film
 Actéon (opera), a 1684 French opera by Marc-Antoine Charpentier
 Actaeon, a non-surviving play by Iophon (fl. 428–405 BC)
 Actaeon, a play by Phrynichus (tragic poet), an early Greek tragedian
 "Actaeon", a chapter of the Japanese anime Metamorphoses

Places
 Acteon Group, a group of islands in French Polynesia
 Actaeon Island
 Actaeon Sound, British Columbia, Canada

Transportation and military
 Actaeon (1815 ship), merchant ship wrecked in 1822, lending its name to Actaeon Island
  or HMS Acteon, several ships and a shore establishment of the Royal Navy
 Actaeon, a Priam-class locomotive of the Great Western Railway
, a French Navy submarine commissioned in 1931 and sunk in 1942

Other uses
 Actaeon beetle (Megasoma actaeon), a rhinoceros beetle 
 Acteon (gastropod), a genus of small sea snails
 Acteon Group (company), a British subsea services company

See also

Acteonidae